Mory Correa (born July 21, 1979 in Versailles) is a French basketball player who played for French Pro-A league clubs Châlons-en-Champagne and Besançon during the 2004-2007 seasons.

References

1979 births
Living people
French expatriate basketball people in the United States
French men's basketball players
Junior college men's basketball players in the United States
Sportspeople from Versailles, Yvelines
Wyoming Cowboys basketball players